Marcela Rubiales Jiménez (born 16 April 1953) is a Mexican singer, actress, and television presenter.

Life

She is the daughter of announcer and presenter Paco Malgesto (Francisco Rubiales Calvo) and singer and actress Flor Silvestre (Guillermina Jiménez Chabolla). 

Rubiales began her career in 1977, when she was given a supporting role in the telenovela La venganza. Later, in 1979, she hosted the television program Complicadísimo. She made her singing debut in the early 1980s and recorded most of her hit songs for Mexico's EMI Capitol label. In films she has starred opposite actors Antonio Aguilar and Gaspar Henaine. She had her own equestrian show in the 1990s and has also acted on stage.

Discography

Studio albums
 Marcela Rubiales (1980)
 Échale un quinto al piano (1982)
 ¡Muy norteña! (1983)
 Papaloteando (1985)
 Tropical sabroso al estilo de Marcela Rubiales (1988)
 Yo seré como siempre (1991)
 Nada con exceso (1993)

References

External links
 

Living people
Mexican women singers
Ranchera singers
Mexican film actresses
Mexican stage actresses
Mexican television actresses
Mexican television presenters
Place of birth missing (living people)
Mexican women television presenters
1953 births